The Document Foundation (TDF) is a non-profit organization that promotes open-source document handling software. It was created by members of the OpenOffice.org community to manage and develop LibreOffice, a free and open-source office suite, and is legally registered in Germany as a Stiftung. Its goal is to produce a vendor-independent office suite with ODF support in a development environment free from company control.

The Document Foundation was created partially over fears that Oracle Corporation, after acquiring Sun Microsystems, would discontinue developing OpenOffice.org as it had done with OpenSolaris.

Organization 

The Document Foundation has multiple bodies running its operations:
 the Board of Directors, which represents the foundation and runs its daily business
 the Membership Committee, which organizes the elections of the board and admits new trustees, giving them voting rights
 the board of trustees ("members"), which elect the Board of Directors and the Membership Committee.

In addition an informal advisory board exists to connect with other organizations and entities.

Board of Directors and Team
The fifth elected Board of Directors has seven members and three deputies. As of May 2021, the Board of Directors composition is:

 Thorsten Behrens
 Michael Meeks
 Franklin Weng (Deputy Chairman)
 Daniel Armando Rodriguez
 Cor Nouws
 Lothar Becker (Chairman)
 Emiliano Vavassori
 Nicolas Christener (Deputy)
 Paolo Vecchi (Deputy)

The Document Foundation employs Florian Effenberger as executive director, who oversees a team of 10 people.

Advisory board
In June 2011 the foundation announced that it had formed an advisory board. The initial members included Google, SUSE, Red Hat, the German registered society Freies Office Deutschland e.V., Software in the Public Interest, and the Free Software Foundation. In February 2012, Intel became a member of the advisory board. In November 2012, Lanedo joined the Advisory Board. In June 2013, the French Inter-Ministry Mutualisation for an Open Productivity Suite (MIMO)—the government working group responsible for 500,000 desktops—and King Abdulaziz City for Science and Technology (KACST) of Saudi Arabia joined the advisory board. In July 2013, TDF announced that AMD joined the Advisory Board. Swiss FOSS company Adfinis joined the Advisory Board in May 2019. In July 2019, the UK Government Digital Service joined.

History

Creation

The Document Foundation was announced on 28 September 2010 with the Foundation being governed by a "Steering Committee" during the phase of initial creation. The announcement received support from companies including Novell, Red Hat, Canonical and Google. In December 2010, The Document Foundation announced that the BrOffice Centre of Excellence for Free Software, the organization behind BrOffice joined the Foundation.

The Foundation also made available a re-branded fork of OpenOffice.org which was based on the upcoming 3.3 version, with patches and build software from the Go-oo fork. It was hoped that the LibreOffice name would be provisional as Oracle was invited to become a member of The Document Foundation, and was asked to donate the OpenOffice.org brand to the project. Following the announcement, Oracle asked members of the OpenOffice.org Community Council who were members of The Document Foundation to step down from the Council, claiming that this represented a conflict of interest, leaving the community council composed 100% of Oracle employees.

Jacqueline Rahemipour, Co-Lead of the OpenOffice.org Board, stated:

When the project was announced, The Document Foundation did not exist as a legal entity. The Steering Committee wished to formally set up a foundation, and following research chose to establish the foundation in Germany. On 16 February 2011, a fundraising drive was announced to raise the €50,000 needed to create a German foundation. The required amount was raised in eight days.

After clearing legal requirements, the foundation was finally incorporated on 17 February 2012.

Reaction

In assessing Oracle's role in the events surrounding the establishment of The Document Foundation, writer Ryan Cartwright in late October 2010 said:

In October 2010 Linux Magazines Bruce Byfield suggested that the formation of The Document Foundation is just the Go-oo project reinventing itself to the long-term detriment of users.

In April 2011, Oracle announced its intention to move OpenOffice.org to a "purely community-based project". Oracle also terminated its commercial product, called Oracle Open Office. In the view of some these moves were a reaction to the formation of The Document Foundation, but according to former Sun executive Simon Phipps: 

As of 2 June 2011 Oracle has relicensed OpenOffice.org under the Apache License 2.0 and transferred ownership of the project's assets and trademarks to the Apache Software Foundation.

Adding the Document Liberation Project

On 2 April 2014, The Document Foundation announced a second top-level project, the Document Liberation Project. It defines itself as "a home for the growing community of developers united to free users from vendor lock-in of content".

References

External links
 

2010 establishments in Germany
Free software project foundations
LibreOffice
Non-profit organisations based in Berlin
OpenOffice
Organizations established in 2010

de:LibreOffice#The Document Foundation